Lulu Island is the name of the largest island in the estuary of the Fraser River, located south of Vancouver, British Columbia, Canada, and the second-most populous island in British Columbia, after Vancouver Island. The city of Richmond occupies most of the island, while a small section at the eastern tip, known as Queensborough, is part of the city of New Westminster.

Lulu Island is situated between the two principal arms of the Fraser River estuary across and downstream from the City of New Westminster. The middle arm of the Fraser River separates it on the northwest from Sea Island, the site of Vancouver International Airport, which, despite its name, is also part of the City of Richmond, and Swishwash Island and Iona Island. At the western edge of the island lies Sturgeon Bank, a large sandbank which falls off into the Strait of Georgia on its western edge. Mitchell Island is to its north. The islands of Annacis, Poplar, Don and Lion are to its east; to the south are Deas, Kirkland, Gunn, Barber, Reifel and Westham. Further upstream to the east are Douglas and Barnston.

History 
Lulu Island was named in 1862 by Richard Moody, after Lulu Sweet, a popular showgirl, possibly of Kanaka (Hawaiian) origin, who had bought property there. When Lulu asked for the name of the island, Richard, who was smitten with her, named it after her in her honour.

The island enjoyed good connections to the new port city of Vancouver thanks to the Lulu Island & Steveston Railway line of the British Columbia Electric Railway, which began at what is today the north end of the Granville Street Bridge. The route of the Lulu Island Railway became known as the Arbutus Corridor, which runs west through Kitsilano before turning south to Kerrisdale and Marpole before crossing the north arm of the Fraser to reach Lulu Island and the City of Richmond. The Eburne swing bridge was removed in 2015, leaving remaining railroad tracks on the Richmond side of the river orphaned. The Arbutus Corridor tracks were removed in 2016 to create a greenway for cyclists and pedestrians.

The southwestern corner of Lulu Island is home to Steveston, a fishing port and former cannery town, home of the Gulf of Georgia Cannery and now a busy tourist centre that has a history interconnected with that of the Japanese-Canadians prior to their internment to the Interior during World War II.

Geohazards 
Because the island is composed partly of glacial silt brought down by the Fraser River, there is a fear of liquefaction of its sands if a tremor with sufficient intensity were to shake it. In such an eventuality, it is anticipated that localized areas, specifically in the vicinity of the present-day mouth of the Fraser River, could experience seismic liquefaction failure and collapse westward into the Strait of Georgia, potentially impacting the adjacent river entrainment works and possibly some navigational aids. Additionally, statically-triggered liquefaction failures have been documented in this area, highlighting the extremely loose localized soil conditions, as well as the high potential for associated slope instability and mass wasting.

The island is also fully diked to protect it from potential flooding during the annual spring freshet on the Fraser. Some of the island is below sea level, and river level, and there is an extensive drainage and pumping system to prevent flooding during heavy rain.

References

Islands of the Fraser River
New Westminster
Richmond, British Columbia